Rui Manuel César Costa  (born 29 March 1972) is a Portuguese former professional footballer who is the 34th president of sports club S.L. Benfica. He also succeeded Luís Filipe Vieira as president of the club's SAD board of directors.

Nicknamed "The Maestro", Costa spent the majority of his football career with Benfica in Portugal and Fiorentina and AC Milan in Italy. In a top-flight career spanning 17 years, he won several trophies, including one Primeira Liga title, one Taça de Portugal, one Serie A title, three Coppa Italia, one UEFA Champions League and one UEFA Super Cup. A Portuguese international, he amassed 94 caps and scored 26 goals for A Seleção and represented the country in three UEFA European Championships and one FIFA World Cup.

Considered one of the best playmakers of all time, Costa usually played as an attacking midfielder and was particularly known for his excellent technique, playmaking ability, and eye for goal from midfield. He is regarded as one of the best midfielders in world football and one of Portugal's best players of all time. In 2004, he was named by Pelé in the FIFA 100 as one of the 125 greatest living football players.

Club career

Benfica 
At age five, Costa joined the infant indoor football team of Damaia Ginásio Clube. Costa tried his luck at Benfica. Within ten minutes of training, Portugal legend Eusébio, who was supervising the youngsters, was impressed with Costa's skills. Up until 1990, Costa played for Benfica's youth squads. In his first full season, he was loaned to A.D. Fafe on a season-long deal.

In 1991, after the Under-21 World Cup, which Portugal won after a penalty kick scored by Costa, he returned to Benfica. In his first full season with Benfica, he was featured regularly in Benfica's team. In his next two seasons, his role in the team would prove to be pivotal as Benfica captured two trophies. He formed a formidable midfield partnership with João Vieira Pinto. During his last two seasons with Benfica in his first spell with the club, he won the Taça de Portugal in 1993 and the Portuguese First Division title in 1993–94. This would be Benfica's last league title for 11 years.

Fiorentina 
At the end of his third season in Benfica's senior squad, Fiorentina offered  for the young midfielder. Since Benfica were struggling with financial problems, Costa had to leave.

Despite heavy competition with the best midfielders at that time, such as Zinedine Zidane, Costa was named the best number 10 player in Serie A a few times. 

His departure from Fiorentina was discussed every season, since many clubs constantly showed interest in signing him. However, he only left Fiorentina one season before their bankruptcy in the 2001–02 season. With the Florentine club, Costa won the Coppa Italia twice, also winning a Supercoppa Italiana. In June 2001, Fiorentina agreed to sell both Costa and Francesco Toldo to Parma for 140 billion lire. Despite both players refusal to join, Costa and Toldo were sold to AC Milan and Inter Milan, respectively, for the same total transfer fee.

AC Milan 
Fatih Terim was the coach of Fiorentina in the 2000–01 season. When he was leaving Fiorentina for AC Milan, he took Costa with him, paying 85 billion lire (€43,898,836) for the player. In so doing, Costa became Milan's most expensive transfer of all time.

On 27 September 2001, Costa scored his first goal for Milan to open a 4–0 home win (6–0 aggregate) in the first round of the UEFA Cup against BATE Borisov. He added further goals in wins over CSKA Sofia (second round) and Hapoel Tel Aviv (quarter-finals) in a run to the last four.

Costa scored his first domestic goal on 18 December 2002, equalising in a 5–1 win (6–2 aggregate) against Ancona at the San Siro in the second leg of the last 16 of the Coppa Italia. In the 6–3 aggregate final win over Roma in May, he played only 30 minutes as a substitute as Brazilians Rivaldo and Serginho were preferred in attacking midfield. This was to rest him for the 2003 UEFA Champions League Final against Juventus, in which he was substituted injured for Massimo Ambrosini near the end of regulation time in a goalless draw that the Rossoneri won on penalties at Old Trafford. On 29 August, he played in the 1–0 victory over Porto in the 2003 UEFA Super Cup, in which he crossed for the only goal by Andriy Shevchenko.

From 2003–04, Costa's playing time was limited by the emergent Brazilian youngster Kaká. He contributed his first three league goals to Milan's title-winning campaign, starting with one in a 5–0 home win over Ancona on 25 January.

Return to Benfica 

On 25 May 2006, Costa's return to Benfica in the upcoming season was announced in a press conference. He had been released from Milan, after both the player and the club reached an agreement to end his €4.6 million per year contract, in order to fulfill his long-held dream of returning to Benfica. Costa started on his return in a 2006–07 UEFA Champions League qualifier against Austria Wien in August 2006, and the second leg saw Costa score in his home return. Despite Costa being used as a regular under manager Fernando Santos when available, the season was impaired with injuries: he suffered a muscle tear in October, which kept him out of action for three months, and another muscular injury in February.

Prior to the end of the season, Costa announced the following one would be his last as a professional. After assuring the qualification to the Champions League group stage, which included a brace from Costa against Copenhagen, Benfica was drawn against Costa's former club Milan.; he returned to play one last time at the San Siro on 18 September 2007. Costa remained a first team choice under José Antonio Camacho and Fernando Chalana and his displays would earn him the SJPF Player of the Month award for September 2007 and Benfica's Player of the Year award for 2007. Costa played his final match on 11 May 2008 at the Estádio da Luz against Vitória de Setúbal. He was substituted in the 86th minute to a standing ovation from the spectators. The season, as well as the previous one, ended trophyless.

International career 
In the summer of 1991, Costa's displays at Fafe had impressed Portugal Under-21 coach Carlos Queiroz so much that he was called up to the team to represent Portugal in the World Youth Cup. The Portuguese under-20 national team won a World Youth Championship in 1991. His clinching penalty kick against Brazil in the final helped win the title on home soil and announced Costa as one of the brightest members of what would become known as the "Golden Generation.”

Costa was a member of Portugal's most consistent years at senior level as the team reached the quarter-finals of UEFA Euro 1996, the semi-finals of Euro 2000 and the final of UEFA Euro 2004.

Costa was especially instrumental in helping Portugal reach the 2004 final on home soil, scoring a screamer of a goal at the Estádio da Luz against England in the quarter-final match, and the sight of a distraught Costa at the end of a 1–0 defeat to Greece was one of the enduring images of the tournament.

Costa also took part in the 2002 FIFA World Cup in Japan and South Korea, scoring Portugal's winning goal in their 4–0 win over Poland. The only time in his career that Costa was sent off was in an international game against Germany.

Despite being principally a provider, Costa scored 26 goals in 94 games; he is Portugal's eighth-highest capped player and seventh-highest goalscorer.

Style of play 
Considered one of the greatest midfielders of his generation and of all time, Costa was a classic number 10, who usually played in a creative role as an attacking midfielder behind the strikers, but was also capable of playing as a deep-lying playmaker, as a second striker, or as a winger. Despite his ability, however, he was also known for being inconsistent.

Media 
Costa was sponsored by American sportswear company Nike and appeared in Nike commercials. In 1996, he starred in a Nike commercial titled "Good vs Evil" in a gladiatorial game set in a Roman amphitheatre. Appearing alongside football players from around the world, including Ronaldo, Paolo Maldini, Eric Cantona, Luís Figo and Patrick Kluivert, they defend "The Beautiful Game" against a team of demonic warriors, before it culminates with Cantona striking the ball and destroying evil. Rui Costa features in EA Sports' FIFA football video game series; he was included in the Ultimate Team Legends in FIFA 16.

Post-playing career

Sporting director 
The day after his last professional match, Costa was presented as director of football at Benfica. During the summer 2008 transfer window, Costa brought head coach Quique Sánchez Flores, playmaker Pablo Aimar, winger José Antonio Reyes, and striker David Suazo, the latter two on loan. The following Summer, Costa tried to strengthen the team after a disappointing league campaign the previous season; he signed striker Javier Saviola, attacking midfielder Ramires, and defensive midfielder Javi García, led by manager Jorge Jesus. Benfica would win the 2009–10 Primeira Liga, the first league title since 2004–05, and the Taça da Liga that season, defeating Porto in the final.

Administration 
On 14 May 2008, Costa was appointed an administrator of Benfica SAD. For the 2020–24 quadrennial, he became a vice-president of the club's board of directors, as part of Luís Filipe Vieira's list for a sixth consecutive mandate. After acting as interim president of the club and its SAD from 9 July 2021, in the aftermath of Vieira suspending his presidency due to arrest, Costa was elected the 34th president of Benfica on 9 October, assuming office the following day. With 84.48% of the votes, he defeated candidate Francisco Benitez, who received 12.24%. During election campaign, Costa had promised, among many promises, a forensic audit of the club's SAD, a revision of the club's statutes – both promises yet to be fulfilled – transparency regarding football transfers, retention of players "made in Seixal", a reduction of the number of players, a maximum wage for players, improvements to Estádio da Luz, etc. Including his interim role, the men's football team was trophyless under his first year of presidency. During the 2022–23 winter transfer window, Costa promised not to release central midfielder Enzo Fernández unless a club paid the player's buyout clause, but Fernández left Benfica via negotiation on 31 January 2023, with Benfica paying to "intermediary services" for the transfer.

Personal life 
Costa was married to Rute from 1994 to 2013, and fathered two sons. The elder, Filipe, is involved in football agency, while the younger, Hugo, is a footballer.

Career statistics

Club

International 

 Scores and results list Portugal's goal tally first, score column indicates score after each Costa goal.

Honours 

Benfica
 Primeira Liga: 1993–94
 Taça de Portugal: 1992–93
 Supertaça Cândido de Oliveira runner-up: 1991, 1993

Fiorentina
 Coppa Italia: 1995–96, 2000–01
 Supercoppa Italiana: 1996

AC Milan
 Serie A: 2003–04
 Coppa Italia: 2002–03
 Supercoppa Italiana: 2004
 UEFA Champions League: 2002–03; runner-up: 2004–05
 UEFA Super Cup: 2003
 Intercontinental Cup runner-up: 2003

Portugal U18
 UEFA Under-18 Championship runner-up: 1990

Portugal U20
 FIFA U-20 World Cup: 1991

Portugal U21
 Toulon Tournament: 1992
 UEFA European Under-21 Championship runner-up: 1994

Portugal
 UEFA European Football Championship runner-up: 2004

Individual
 Toulon Tournament Best Player: 1992
 Toulon Tournament top goalscorer: 1992
 UEFA European Championship Team of the Tournament: 1996, 2000
 FIFA XI: 1998
 UEFA Champions League top assist provider: 2002–03
 FIFA 100
 FIFA World Player of the Year: 2001 (12th place)
 Ballon d'Or: 1996 (26th place), 2000 (24th place), 2001 (25th place)
 SJPF Player of the Month: September 2007
 Cosme Damião Awards – Footballer of the Year: 2007
 AC Milan Hall of Fame
 Fiorentina All-time XI
 IFFHS Portugal All-time XI
 Globe Soccer Awards Portugal Best Ever XI
 AFS Top-100 Players of All Time #85: 2007
 The Guardian Serie A Best Team of the 90s
 Serie A Team of the Season 1994–95 

Orders
  Officer of the Order of Prince Henry

References

Further reading

External links 

 

1972 births
Living people
People from Amadora
Portuguese footballers
Portugal international footballers
S.L. Benfica footballers
AD Fafe players
ACF Fiorentina players
A.C. Milan players
Primeira Liga players
Serie A players
Portuguese expatriate footballers
Expatriate footballers in Italy
Portuguese expatriate sportspeople in Italy
FIFA 100
UEFA Euro 1996 players
UEFA Euro 2000 players
UEFA Euro 2004 players
2002 FIFA World Cup players
Association football midfielders
UEFA Champions League winning players
S.L. Benfica presidents
Sportspeople from Lisbon District